Le Montsaugeonnais is a commune in the Haute-Marne department of northeastern France. The municipality was established on 1 January 2016 and consists of the former communes of Montsaugeon, Prauthoy and Vaux-sous-Aubigny.

See also 
Communes of the Haute-Marne department

References 

Communes of Haute-Marne